FIFA House, Lahore is looking after the sports of Football in Pakistan and provides guidance on international football standards. The main purpose of the FIFA House is to educate coaches, referees, women's football, beach soccer, and administrative and medical matters.

References

Football in Pakistan